The Complete Last Concert is a double CD live album by American jazz group the Modern Jazz Quartet featuring performances recorded at Avery Fisher Hall in 1974 and released on the Atlantic label originally as a double album The Last Concert (1975) and More from the Last Concert (1981) before the complete edition was released in 1988.

Reception
The Allmusic review stated "The Modern Jazz Quartet broke up after the concert documented on this double CD. It would be nearly seven years before the group got back together again but it certainly went out on top". The Penguin Guide to Jazz Recordings includes the album in its suggested core collection.

Track listing
All compositions by John Lewis except as indicated

Disc One:
 "Softly, as in a Morning Sunrise" (Oscar Hammerstein II, Sigmund Romberg) - 6:25    
 "The Cylinder" (Milt Jackson) - 5:28 
 "Summertime" (George Gershwin, Ira Gershwin, DuBose Heyward) - 7:49 
 "Really True Blues" (Jackson) - 5:27    
 "What's New?" (Johnny Burke, Bob Haggart) - 7:12    
 "Blues in A Minor" - 7:46    
 "Confirmation" (Charlie Parker) - 4:53    
 "'Round Midnight" (Thelonious Monk) - 7:34    
 "A Night in Tunisia" (Dizzy Gillespie, Frank Paparelli) - 5:21    
 "Tears from the Children" (Johann Sebastian Bach) -  5:00    
 "Blues in H (B)" (Jackson) - 5:28    
 "England's Carol" - 5:42 
Disc Two:
 "The Golden Striker" - 5:26    
 "One Never Knows" - 7:23    
 "Trav'lin'" - 5:38    
 "Skating in Central Park" - 6:32    
 "The Legendary Profile" (Jackson) - 4:30    
 "Concierto de Aranjuez" (Joaquín Rodrigo) - 10:50    
 "The Jasmine Tree" - 4:05    
 "In Memoriam" - 16:47    
 "Django" - 6:09    
 "Bags' Groove" (Jackson) - 6:40

Personnel
Milt Jackson - vibraphone
John Lewis - piano
Percy Heath - bass
Connie Kay - drums

References

Modern Jazz Quartet live albums
Atlantic Records live albums
1988 live albums